My Kind of Town is an American television game show that premiered on August 14, 2005 on ABC. Part variety show, part game show, the series brings 200 people from a small town in the United States to New York City to compete for prizes and participate in games and assorted gags.  At the end of the show, one of the 200 who was preselected prior to the show competes in a game called "Name Your Neighbors" where, if the person is successful in identifying the names of six people featured in the program, the entire audience wins a prize.

The show was hosted by English television and radio presenter Johnny Vaughan.  The show's executive producer was Michael Davies of Who Wants to Be a Millionaire, and the first project of his new production company Embassy Row.

Stuck between mid-summer reruns of Extreme Makeover: Home Edition and Desperate Housewives, the show's ratings were dismal, with the premiere episode receiving just a 2.9 rating among 18-49 viewers, with about 11.4 million viewers.  By the third episode, the show received a 2.1 rating, with about 5.1 million viewers. Only four of seven episodes had aired when ABC canceled the show.

Episodes 

Future towns to have been featured in My Kind of Town included Bordentown, New Jersey, Egg Harbor City, New Jersey and Deep River, Connecticut.

References

External links
 
 Official Website (via Internet Archive)

2000s American comedy game shows
2005 American television series debuts
2005 American television series endings
American Broadcasting Company original programming
Television series by Embassy Row (production company)
Television series by Sony Pictures Television
Television shows set in the United States